Paul Cerutti (30 November 1910 – 21 September 2000) was a Monegasque former sports shooter. He competed at the 1972 Summer Olympics and the 1976 Summer Olympics.

References

1910 births
2000 deaths
Monegasque male sport shooters
Olympic shooters of Monaco
Shooters at the 1972 Summer Olympics
Shooters at the 1976 Summer Olympics
Place of birth missing